Lake Worth is the name of several places in the United States:

Lake Worth Beach, Florida, a city
Lake Worth Lagoon, a lagoon in Florida
Lake Worth, Texas, a town in Texas
Lake Worth (Texas), a lake in Texas

It may also refer to:
Lake Worth Open, a former golf tournament
Wörthsee, a glacial lake in the Starnberg district of Bavaria, Germany
Wörthersee, an alpine lake in the southern Austrian state of Carinthia